John Fallows was an English footballer who played at half-back for Burslem Port Vale.

Career
Fallows joined Burslem Port Vale in January 1896, and made his debut at the Athletic Ground in a 4–0 loss to rivals Stoke on 8 February 1896, in the first round of the Staffordshire Senior Cup. He played eight Second Division games in the 1895–96 season. The next season Vale played in the Midland Football League, and Fallows made 21 appearances, scoring three goals, before being released upon its conclusion.

Career statistics
Source:

References

Year of birth missing
Year of death missing
English footballers
Association football midfielders
Port Vale F.C. players
Midland Football League players
English Football League players